Thurner is a surname. Notable people with the surname include:

Helene Thurner (born 1938), Austrian luger 
Jan-Kristian Thurner (born 1998), Austrian football player
Stefan Thurner (born 1969), Austrian physicist and complexity researcher
Wilfried Thurner (born 1927), Austrian bobsledder

Toponymic surnames